The Pentax K200D is a 10.2-megapixel digital single-lens reflex camera, announced on January 24, 2008, along with the higher-end K20D.  It was discontinued in December 2008, giving it the distinction of being one of the shortest-lived DSLR cameras.

The K200D is the successor to the well-reviewed K100D, K110D, and K100D Super 6-megapixel DSLR's from Pentax, from which it retains body construction, penta-mirror viewfinder and autofocus module. The K200D adopts several of the features of the more advanced K10D, namely its 10.2 megapixel CCD sensor and body weather-sealing.

The MSRP of the Pentax K200D was $620 for the body only at launch, or $699 with an updated 18-55mm II 3.5-5.6 kit lens.

Features 

The Pentax K200D has 60 seals for weather/dust resistance. It uses non-proprietary AA batteries like previous Pentax entry-level offerings.

The K200D's lens mount is the K-mount; so it is compatible with Pentax (and third-party) lenses dating as far back as 1975 without the use of adaptors. As all Pentax DSLR's it can use previous M42 mount lenses in manual mode with an adapter, provided by Pentax or independent manufacturers.

The K200D's on-board flash can be used to allow wireless control of Pentax or compatible flashes as a Master (The on-board flash fires during the capture), or as a Controller (The on-board flash does not fire during the capture). This supports P-TTL, but can also be used to fire the external flashes in Auto or Manual Mode.

The K200D utilizes a 2.7" LCD screen with a total pixel count of 230,000.

References

External links

Official:
  Marketing posters for the K20D, K200D, and new lenses
 Pentax-DA Lens Operating Manual download site including details of KAF, KAF2 and KAF3 mount contacts and couplers, using the Quick-Shift Focus System, etc.

Reviews:
 Pentax K200D Review from Camera Labs
 Pentax K200D Review from Steve's Digicams
 Pentax K200D Review from photographyreview.com

K0200D
Cameras introduced in 2008
Pentax K-mount cameras